Ozalla is a prominent town in Nkanu West Local Government Area of Enugu State, Nigeria.

Although the town officially goes by the colonial name "Ozalla", the correct form "Ozara" is the most widely used by the natives in their Ozara dialect of Igbo language.

Ozalla people are descendants of Okpatu-Oke in present day Udi LGA.

Ozalla is bordered to the North by Akegbe-Ugwu, to the East by Obe, to the West by Udi and to the South by Ituku, which it shares the University of Nigeria Teaching Hospital (UNTH) landscape. Vast majority of the land for the popular hospital belong to Ozalla.

Ozalla is often referred to as the gateway to Nkanu land because of its strategic location along the major access roads to this region.

Ozalla is known by many because of the popular 4-corners junction located along the ENUGU-PH Expressway, though an average Ozalla indigene will tell you that 4-corners is the one at Afor-Agu market and Ozalla High School.

Ozalla is made up of 6 villages:

Amigbo

Amechi

Ezzih

Enugu-Egu

Umuokorouba and

Obeagwu, with more than twenty sub villages such as Obunegu, Umuaniegu, Enugwuegu-ndiuno Ameke, etc.

In 2002, Ozalla was split into five administrative units (Autonomous Communities):

Ishi-Ozalla

Etiti-Ozalla

Okorouba-Ozalla

Obeagwu-Ozalla and

Umuanee-Ozalla.

Prior to this, Ozalla had one traditional ruler, which the Chukwuani family from Amigbo had held for decades, but currently each autonomous community has an "Igwe".

Igwe Donald Nwochi (Chinenyeze 1 of Etiti-Ozalla) is one of the Igwes.

Ozalla are predominantly Christians, with Catholic majority. Other Christian denominations like Anglican, Apostolic Pentecostal, Sabbath and several others abound. Of course, some people practice other religions, especially Peganism in Ozalla.

Ozalla has a river that runs across the town called the Ufamu, which remains the major source of water supply for the inhabitants.

Ani Ozalla in Amigbo is the home of Oji-Ngenani, the ancestral capital of Ozalla, where live fowls are usually offered to crocodiles by the high priest on behalf of people who come to seek help for various purposes.

In recent years, Ani Ozalla has been a major tourist attraction for visitors coming to Ozalla.

Every January 1, Ozalla town celebrate their annual cultural/Masquerade day nicknamed "Ozalla Day" at Ugwu Ndaru (Ishi-Ozalla Community school compound). Previously, Ozalla Day was held at Nkwo market square.

Some notable names of Ozalla indigene are:

 Willy Chukwuani, who had been a former Local government chairman of Nkanu Local government
Frank Nweke jnr - Enugu State Chief Of Staff (2001-2003). Former minister of Information and National Orientation Agency and subsequently Minister of Information and Communication during Olusegun Obasanjo's government.
KenSteve Anuka - Nollywood movie maker, Producer and Director.
Christian Obodo - Former Super Eagles and Udinese player.
Stephen Chukude - Nigerian Professional Football League player, formerly with FC Ifeanyiuba and Enyimba FC. 
Emmanuel Dikachi Nwachukwu - A Legal Practitioner, CEO of Ikenga Homez and a budding politician

OZALLA, IGBO-ETITI 
This is another town in Enugu State that bears the same name as (Ozalla) but is located in a different local government area. Ozalla in Igbo-Etiti LGA has two autonomous communities which are Ozalla Uwenu and Ozalla Uwani. It is made up of six villages namely:

 Nnaru
 Isiamelu
 Ikolo
 Akaibite
 Ijo
 Ujoma

References

Towns in Enugu State